John Cutliffe is an Irish musician from Buncrana, County Donegal. He was born on February 8, 1962. He is known as a musician, songwriter and producer and has worked in London, Nashville and Ireland.

Early life
John Cutliffe was born on February 8, 1962, in Buncrana, Co. Dongeal, Ireland, to parents Kevin Cutliffe and Ailish Cutliffe. He attended Scoil Mhuire, Buncrana, a Secondary School in his home town. His passion was always music and he was still in school when he played in his first bands including Shandrum with his cousin Paul Rodden who would go on to be John's music collaborator for many decades.

In Bands

John has played Irish traditional and bluegrass music in the many pubs that dot the Irish countryside and has played with many pop and rock bands over the years. In London his Irish bluegrass band The Pyros teamed up with Frank Tovey (AKA Fad Gadget) and recorded albums on Mute Records.

Cutliffe helped formed The Pyros in his home town of Buncrana. The group developed a following in the North West of Ireland. Various lineups included Kevin Doherty (Four Men and a Dog) and Ciaran Tourish (Altan). During this time John played with well-known musicians, including Altan, Gerry O Connor, Ted Hawkins and former Wings guitarist Henry McCullough.

Cutliffe is the owner and editor of JigTime, a website that chronicled Irish and American roots music. He was the Tour Manager and general U.S. "man on the ground" for Irish traditional band Altan. He is a keen photographer and his pictures can be seen on websites including Rosanne Cash's site and the MerleFest site and on album covers both in Ireland and Nashville.

In 2005, Cutliffe teamed up with Andrea Zonn to produce the Hands Across The Water CD, a 16 track collaboration album between Celtic and American artists for children who were orphaned in the south east asian tsunami. The 16 track album has over 100 musicians recorded in 30 different studios all over the world. Artists on the album include John Prine, Paul Brady, Jackson Browne, Vince Gill and several more household names collaborating on new and remixed songs. The album was released on Compass Records in Nashville.

Shyma Smiled For Me
In October 2014, John and fellow Dongegal musician Rory Gallagher teamed up to work on "Shyma Smiled For Me". The song was released on December 5, 2014, with all proceeds going to children's charities in Gaza. The charity proceeds and dedication was prompted by the producer and co-writer visiting injured patients from the Gaza war in Jerusalem hospitals. The song was written by John and Rory and featured many well known Irish and UK artists as well as a choir of children from Jerusalem and his son, Kevin. In addition to Cutliffe himself, the lineup included Rory Gallagher, Muireann Nic Amhlaoibh, Liam O Maonlai, Donogh Hennessy, Honor Heffernan, Martin Tourish, Wee Glee Singers, Jerusalem Children’s Choir, Brian Mullan, Laurence Doherty, Clare Lindley, Claire McDaid, and Sophia Brock, as well as Kevin and Caroline Cutliffe. The song made a brief appearance in the Irish download charts in 2015.

John continues to write and produce and also writes for various websites and publications.

Bands
 The Pyros, AKA The Pyrotechnicos - bass, guitars
 Pluto - bass
 Fiveskin - bass
 Shandrum - guitar
 Frank Tovey and the Pyros- bass, guitar
 The Other Brothers - bass, guitar
 Beware of the Dog - guitar
 The Barry McGuigan Band - bass guitar
 The Whiskey Priests - bass
 The Bordercollies - bass, guitar
 No River City - bass

Discography
 Grand Union with Frank Tovey and the Pyros (musician, bass and guitars) (1991)
 Worried Men In Second Hand Suits with Frank Tovey and the Pyros (musician, bass and guitars) (1992)
 Travelling Home - Rory Mcleod (Musician, bass)  (1991)
 Beware of the Dog - Beware of the Dog (musician, guitar, vocals, songwriter)
 Barr Trá - Mary Custy and Quentin Cooper (inside cover photograph)
 New Kid in Town - Ryan Holladay (cover photography)
 Hands Across The Water (2005) (Producer, photography)
 Down the Line - Ciaran Tourish (cover photography, liner notes)
 Shyma Smiled for Me (2015) (Producer, songwriter, arranger) 
 Five (2016) (Producer, composer

References

External links 

 The Pyros website on JigTime
 Fad Gadget official website
 Altan official website

Irish guitarists
Irish male guitarists
Living people
1962 births